A fleuron is a flower-shaped ornament, and in architecture may have a number of meanings:

 It is a collective noun for the ornamental termination at the ridge of a roof, such as a crop, finial or épi. 
 It is also a form of stylised Late Gothic decoration in the form of a four-leafed square, often seen on crockets and cavetto mouldings. 
 It can be the ornament in the middle of each concave face of a Corinthian abacus. 
 Finally, it can be a form of anthemion, the decorative Greek floral decoration.

Gallery

See also
Flamboyant

References
 
 

Architectural elements
Ornaments (architecture)